Springfield Gardens High School was a public 4–year high school located in the Springfield Gardens section in the New York City borough of Queens. The school was opened in 1965. Closed in 2007, The Springfield Gardens High School building is now a complex made up of four other schools named Springfield Gardens Educational Campus. The schools are named Preparatory Academy for Writers, Queens Preparatory Academy, Excelsior Preparatory High School, and George Washington Carver High School for the Sciences.

History
Opening in 1965, Springfield Gardens High School was plagued by poor test scores and a high drop-out rate by the late–1970s. After years of poor performance, the school graduated its last class in June 2007.

Schools/Facilities
 Excelsior Preparatory High School and George Washington Carver High School for the Sciences are preparatory schools with an emphasis on science. To help the students prepare for college, students may participate in a Gateway Institute for Pre-College Education science program that will allow students to have internships or work with Queens College professors. Students wishing to pursue technical or vocational training may participate in Excelsior Prep's program with the School of Cooperative Technical Education. A veterinary program is offered at George Washington Carver.
Queens Preparatory Academy and the Preparatory Academy for Writers has humanities, journalism, and performing arts programs.
Success Academy Charter Schools was co-located on the campus during the 2014/2015 school year. The schools participate in a program to improve college education for Latino and black boys called the Expanded Success Initiative.
Preparatory Academy for Writers carries sixth and seventh graders and is the only school of the four currently taking junior high students. Shared facilities across the schools include a cafeteria, gymnasium, media center and outdoor fields for sports programs.

Current principals
Excelsior Preparatory High School – Lilly Lucas
Queens Preparatory Academy – Tashon Haywood
Preparatory Academy for Writers – Charles Anderson
George Washington Carver High School – Janice Sutton

Notable alumni
This is a partial list of notable alumni of Springfield Gardens High School. Names on this list should either have an accompanying existing article link which verifies they are an alumnus, or reliable sources as footnotes against the name showing they are a notable alumnus.

Lawrence Bush, 1968 – author, editor (Jewish Currents).
Alan Jacobson, 1978 - author
Calvin Bruton, 1972 – basketball player, NBA and Australian League.
Pepa (Sandra Denton) – hip-hop artist, rapper and actress (Salt-N-Pepa).
Charles Jenkins, 2006 – basketball player, NBA (Philadelphia 76ers); won multiple Haggerty Awards at Hofstra University.
Susan B. Landau, 1970 – film and television producer (Cool Runnings, Mary and Rhoda)
Anthony Mason, 1985 – basketball player, NBA (1989–2003), and 2001 All–Star.
Eric V. Moyé, 1972 – district judge (State of Texas).
Mike Mazzei, 1975 – Wall Street executive
Phife Dawg, 1988 – rapper and member of A Tribe Called Quest
Norm Roberts, 1983 – basketball coach (Queens' College, St. John's).
Khandi Alexander, 1977 – actress
Mikey D, 1986 – rapper (Mikey D & the L.A. Posse, Main Source).

References

External links
Review at insideschools.org

Defunct high schools in Queens, New York
Public high schools in Queens, New York
Educational institutions established in 1965
1965 establishments in New York City
Public middle schools in Queens, New York